The 1965–66 FIBA European Champions Cup was the ninth season of the European top-tier level professional basketball club competition FIBA European Champions Cup (now called EuroLeague). It was won by Simmenthal Milano, for the first time in its history, the first of the club's three EuroLeague championships.

Simmenthal defeated Slavia VŠ Praha, by a score of 77–72, in the final of the first ever Champions Cup Final Four held in the EuroLeague competition, with two venues used: a venue in Milan, and the Palazzo dello sport arena in Bologna, Italy. The Italian team, featuring future the Basketball Hall of Fame member Bill Bradley, defeated the favorites and former champs, CSKA Moscow, in the semifinal, by a score of 57–68.

Competition system
26 teams. European national domestic league champions, plus the then current FIBA European Champions Cup title holders only, playing in a tournament system. The competition culminated in a Final Four.

First round

*Series decided over a third game after having tied aggregate score after the two home-away games.

Second round

|}

*Series decided over a third game after having tied aggregate score after the two home-away games.

Quarterfinals group stage
For the first time in the competition history, the quarterfinals were played with a round-robin system, in which every Two Game series (TGS) constituted as one game for the record. A third decisive game was played if the aggregate score of the first two games was tied.

Standings

|  style="vertical-align:top; width:33%;"|

Group B

Games

|}

Standings

|}

Final four

Semifinals
March 31, Milan

|}

March 30, Palazzo dello sport, Bologna

|}

3rd place game
April 1, Milan

|}

Final
April 1, Palazzo dello sport, Bologna

|}

Final standings

Awards

FIBA European Champions Cup Finals Top Scorer
 Jiří Zídek Sr. ( Slavia VŠ Praha)

References

External links
1965–66 FIBA European Champions Cup 
1965–66 FIBA European Champions Cup
Real Madrid game Details
Champions Cup 1965–66 Line-ups and Stats

1965-66
FIBA